The Guards Army was a guards operational formation (association, army) of the Workers' and Peasants' Red Army of the Armed Forces of the Soviet Union during the Great Patriotic War and in the postwar period. Guards Armies are also currently in the Russian Armed Forces.

Guards Armies appeared in the Armed Forces of the Soviet Union, when for the displayed heroism, courage and high combat skill by the personnel of the formations (such as the army and the tank army), they were awarded honorary titles – the guards.

History
As an operational formation, the "army" first emerged at the beginning of the 19th century. The emergence of armies was caused by an increase in the size of the armed forces of the state, the development of weapons and military equipment, communications and the increased spatial scope of military operations. In these conditions, to increase the efficiency of command and control, to better use the combat and maneuverable capabilities of the troops, it was necessary to divide the armed forces operating in the theater of operations into armies, and the Russians were the first to do this. From 1806 to the 60s of the 19th century, the Russian Imperial Army included corps (the highest formations in the infantry and cavalry are non–permanent), which had two divisions (a permanent military formation consisting of two or three brigades of two-regiment composition and an artillery brigade) and artillery brigades (corps).

There were guards formations in the Russian Imperial Army, the largest of which is the 1st Guards Corps. After the October Revolution, they were all disbanded.

During the Great Patriotic War, for the heroism, courage and high military skill of the personnel shown in the defense of the Fatherland from the attacking enemy, the assignment of honorary titles to the formations of the Workers' and Peasants' Red Army began – the guards. Upon receipt of its formation, it was renamed, they were assigned new military numbers. Accordingly, as the number of guards formations increased, guards corps and armies appeared. Guards Armies were formed from guards formations and units.

During operations, the Guards Armies were used in the most critical sectors and directions, since they had an increased combat ability in the offensive and special staunchness in defense.

In total, during the Great Patriotic War, 11 armies and 6 tank armies were awarded the honorary title of the Guards.

During the period of Khrushchev's reductions, Guards Mechanized Armies appeared in the Armed Forces of the Soviet Union, and later returned to the Guards Tank Armies.

Structure
The composition of the Guards Army, depending on the type of troops, included:
Management (headquarters);
Formations (corps, divisions);
Units (brigades, regiments, separate battalions, divizions and companies);
Institutions (hospitals, bases, warehouses).

Banner
Each Guards Army was awarded a Guards Red Banner in accordance with the Regulations on the Red Banners of the Guards Army and the Guards Corps:

Formations

1st Guards Army;
2nd Guards Army;
3rd Guards Army;
4th Guards Army;
5th Guards Army;
6th Guards Army;
7th Guards Army;
8th Guards Army;
9th Guards Army;
10th Guards Army;
11th Guards Army;
20th Guards Army;
1st Guards Tank Army;
2nd Guards Tank Army;
3rd Guards Tank Army;
4th Guards Tank Army;
5th Guards Tank Army;
6th Guards Tank Army;
1st Guards Mechanized Army;
2nd Guards Mechanized Army;
3rd Guards Mechanized Army;
4th Guards Mechanized Army;
5th Guards Mechanized Army;
6th Guards Mechanized Army;
33rd Guards Missile Army.

See also
Separate Missile Attack Warning Army

References

Sources
Great Soviet Encyclopedia, Third Edition, Published by the Publishing House "Soviet Encyclopedia" in 1969–1978 in 30 Volumes
A – Bureau of Military Commissars / Edited by Andrey Grechko – Moscow: Military Publishing House of the Ministry of Defense of the Soviet Union, 1976 – 637 Pages – (Soviet Military Encyclopedia: in 8 Volumes; 1976–1980, Volume 1)
Soviet Armed Forces – 60 Years Old (Accompanying Text, Part Two) / N. I. Kobrin, B. P. Frolov – Moscow: Knowledge, 1978 – 32 Pages
Soviet Armed Forces. Construction History – Moscow: Military Publishing House of the Ministry of Defense of the Soviet Union, 1978
Military Encyclopedic Dictionary, Moscow, Military Publishing House of the Ministry of Defense of the Soviet Union, 1984, 863 Pages With Illustrations, 30 Sheets
Guards Army // Great Patriotic War, 1941–1945: Encyclopedia / Edited by Mikhail Kozlov – Moscow: Soviet Encyclopedia, 1985 – Page 501 – 500,000 Copies
Dictionary of Military Terms / Compiled by Anatoly Plekhov, S. G. Shapkin – Moscow: Military Publishing House of the Ministry of Defense of the Soviet Union, 1988
A. Kryukovskikh. Dictionary of Historical Terms – 1998;

Big Encyclopedic Dictionary, 2000
Andrey Lensky, Mikhail Tsybin. "Soviet Ground Forces in the Last Year of the Soviet Union. Directory" – Saint Petersburg, 2001
Vitaly Feskov, Konstantin Kalashnikov, Valery Golikov. Soviet Army During the Cold War (1945–1991) – Tomsk: Tomsk University Publishing House, 2004 – 236 Pages
60 Years of the Great Victory
Soviet Tank Troops, 1941–1945

Guards Armies